The 2019 Coral World Grand Prix was a professional snooker tournament that took place from 4 to 10 February 2019 at The Centaur, Cheltenham Racecourse in Cheltenham, England. It was the twelfth ranking event of the 2018/2019 season and a part of the newly created Coral Cup.

Judd Trump won his 10th ranking title, beating Ali Carter 10–6 in the final.

Prize fund
The breakdown of prize money for this year is shown below:

 Winner: £100,000
 Runner-up: £40,000
 Semi-final: £20,000
 Quarter-final: £12,500
 Last 16: £7,500
 Last 32: £5,000

 Highest break: £5,000
 Total: £375,000

The "rolling 147 prize" for a maximum break: £10,000

Seeding list
The top 32 players on the one-year ranking list, running from the 2018 Riga Masters until and including the 2019 German Masters, qualified for the tournament.

Ranking points (prize money won in GBP)

Tournament draw

Final

Century breaks
Total: 25

 143, 134, 130, 116  Barry Hawkins
 138, 118, 101, 101  David Gilbert
 138  Mark Williams
 132, 122, 113, 102, 100  Judd Trump
 131, 102  Stuart Bingham
 131, 100  Yuan Sijun
 127  Ryan Day

 126  Ali Carter
 126  Ding Junhui
 119  Jimmy Robertson
 108  John Higgins
 106  Xiao Guodong
 103  Noppon Saengkham

References

2019
Players Series
2019 in snooker
2019 in English sport
2019
February 2019 sports events in the United Kingdom
Sport in Cheltenham